Kauno futbolo ir beisbolo klubas, commonly known as FBK Kaunas, was a Lithuanian football club from the city of Kaunas.

History

Banga Kaunas (1960–1993)
Originally the team was founded in 1960 as Banga Kaunas and played its first three years in the Soviet First League. Afterwards the club decided to play in the Lithuanian SSR Championship and they did so until 1990. In that period they won two Lithuanian SSR Championship's. One in 1986 and another in 1989. When Lithuania regained independence in 1991 A Lyga was created and they played as Banga Kaunas until 1993 before the club changed its name.

FBK Kaunas (1993–1999 and 2000–2012)
The club changed its name in 1993 to Kauno futbolo beisbolo klubas. The club had in its first years not such a great success and FBK Kaunas had to wait until 1999 before they could lift a trophy again. Club was shortly renamed to Žalgiris Kaunas after the 9th round of 1999 A Lyga, but only carried the name for the remaining of the season. From 1999 to 2008, Kaunas won 8 championships, 4 Lithuanian cups, 3 super cups and 1 Baltic league title, but in the autumn of 2008 Kaunas dominance was once and for all broken when FK Ekranas won the championship in front of FBK Kaunas. After finishing second in 2008 A Lyga  championship the club's president announced that the club were being demoted from the A Lyga in favour of LFF I Lyga, the 2nd tier of Lithuanian football system, but as conflict with LFF intensified, FBK Kaunas was relegated to LFF II lyga (consisting of amateur teams).

FBK Kaunas won II lyga championship in their first year in that division. Despite relegation FBK Kaunas also participated in the new UEFA Europe League as a vice-champ of Lithuania but did not advance past FK Sevojno. Despite drawing both games FBK Kaunas lost on away goals. FBK Kaunas won I Lyga in 2010 and was promoted to the 2011 A Lyga season. The 2011 season was a huge disappointment for Kaunas as they didn't manage to live up to the high expectations and eventually ended at a 10th place.

FBK Kaunas were not granted a 2012 A Lyga license because of financial problems and was due to play in the 2012 I Lyga. However, due to the clubs increasing financial problems the chairman eventually decided to withdraw the club from any competitions and later declared the club bankrupt. Shortly afterwards the fans decided to form a new club.

Kaunas have played Celtic, Rangers and Liverpool among others in Europa League and  Champions League qualifying stages. On 5 August 2008, FBK Kaunas defeated Rangers, 2–1, to advance to the third qualifying round of the UEFA Champions League for the first time. The game was won in dramatic circumstances as Kaunas had to come from behind and finally took the lead just four minutes from time. Linas Pilibaitis was the scorer.

FBK Kaunas were for many years (1993–2012) sponsored by Ūkio bankas, a bank which had Vladimir Romanov as its principal shareholder. In October 2005 Romanov became the majority shareholder of Scottish Premier League side, Heart of Midlothian. Romanov then used Kaunas as a feeder club for Hearts by signing players ostensibly for Kaunas, then immediately loaning them to the SPL side.  Romanov's mismanagement and dubious dealings effectively destroyed the clubs he was involved with FBK Kaunas and Partizan Minsk going bankrupt and Hearts into administration. BC Zalgiris also suffer from his dishonesty to this day. Romanov fled to Russia where he was granted asylum in 2014 and is now wanted by the Lithuanian prosecutors on charges for fraud and embezzling for at least £308m.

Honours

Domestic
A Lyga
Winners (8): 1999, 2000, 2001, 2002, 2003, 2004, 2006, 2007
Runners-up (2): 2005, 2008
I Lyga
Winners (1): 2010
II Lyga
Winners (1): 2009
Lithuanian Cup
Winners (4): 2002, 2004, 2005, 2008
Runners-up (2): 1998, 1999
Lithuanian Super Cup
Winners (3): 2002, 2004, 2006,
Runners-up (2): 2003, 2005
Lithuanian SSR Championship
Winners (2): 1986, 1989
Lithuanian SSR Cup
Winners (1):1989
Runners-up (3): 1984, 1985, 1986

Continental
Baltic League
Winners (1): 2008
Commonwealth of Independent States Cup
Runners-up (1): 2006

Season-by-season

Domestic

European cup

Coaches

 Povilas Grigonis (1986)
 Algirdas Gruzdas (1989)
 Šenderis Giršovičius (1995–96), (1998–00)
 Sergei Borovsky (July 2003 – April 4)
 Šenderis Giršovičius (April 2004 – Sept 04)
 Valdas Ivanauskas (Sept 2004 – April 5)
 Eugenijus Riabovas (April 2005 – May 5)
 Aleksandr Piskaryov (May 2005 – July 5)
 Igoris Pankratjevas (July 2005 – Nov 05)
 Eduard Malofeyev (Dec 2005 – June 6)
 Eugenijus Riabovas (June 2006 – Feb 07)
 Vladimir Kurnev (Feb 2007 – April 7)
 Angel Chervenkov (April 2007 – June 7)
 Artūras Ramoška (June 2007 – Sept 07)
 Anton Joore (Aug 2007 – Sept 07)
 Andrei Zygmantovich (Sept 2007 – July 8)
 Jose Couceiro (July 2008 – Oct 08)
 Andrei Zygmantovich (Nov 2008 – Dec 08)
 Eugenijus Riabovas (Dec 2008 – April 9)
 Saulius Vertelis (April 2009 – Sept 10)
 Darius Gvildys (Sept 2010 – March 11)
 Eugenijus Riabovas (March 2011 – Feb 12)

References

External links
 Statistics & Info 

 
Kaunas
2012 disestablishments in Lithuania
Association football clubs disestablished in 2012
Kaunas
1960 establishments in Lithuania
Football clubs in Kaunas